The Anchorage Bucs Baseball Club is a college summer baseball team in Anchorage, Alaska.  The team has been a member of the Alaska Baseball League since 1981.

They were originally formed in 1980 as an Anchorage Adult League team. Team colors are black and gold. Former players who advanced to the majors include Keith Foulke, Geoff Jenkins, Wally Joyner, Don August, Jeff Kent and numerous others. They were known as the Cook Inlet Bucs until 1984.

Home games are played at Mulcahy Stadium in Anchorage.

External links
 

1980 establishments in Alaska
Alaska Baseball League
Amateur baseball teams in Alaska
Baseball teams established in 1980
Sports in Anchorage, Alaska
Baseball teams in Alaska